The 1976–77 Northern Premier League was the ninth season of the Northern Premier League, a regional football league in Northern England, the northern areas of the Midlands and North Wales. The season began on 21 August 1976 and concluded on 20 May 1977.

Overview
The League featured twenty-three teams for the first time.  The systems of goal average was replaced by goal difference.

Team changes
The following club left the League at the end of the previous season:
Skelmersdale United resigned, demoted to Lancashire Combination
Fleetwood folded

The following club joined the League at the start of the season:
Frickley Athletic promoted from Midland League (1889)

League table

Results

Stadia and locations

Cup results

Challenge Cup

Northern Premier League Shield

Between Champions of NPL Premier Division and Winners of the NPL Cup.

FA Cup

Out of the twenty-four clubs from the Northern Premier League, only three teams reached the second round:

Second Round

Third Round

 	
Fourth Round

FA Trophy

Out of the twenty-four clubs from the Northern Premier League, three teams reached the fourth round:

Fourth Round

Semi-finals

Final

End of the season
At the end of the ninth season of the Northern Premier League, Altrincham who put forward for election did not receive enough votes to be promoted to the Football League.

Football League elections
Alongside the four Football League teams facing re-election, two non-League teams, one from the Northern Premier League and the other from the Southern League. Applied to be elected.  Three out of the four Football League teams were re-elected.  Wimbledon from the Southern League replaced Workington from the Football League as they didn't receive enough votes.  Workington was subsequently relegated to the Northern Premier League.

Promotion and relegation
The following club left the League at the end of the season:
Gateshead United folded. A new club formed Gateshead replaced.

The following club joined the League the following season:
Workington relegated from Football League Fourth Division

References

External links
 Northern Premier League official website
 Northern Premier League tables at RSSSF
 Football Club History Database

Northern Premier League seasons
5